The urumi is a long Indian whip-like sword.

Urumi may also refer to:

 Urumi (drum), a double-headed hour-glass shaped drum used in South India
 Urumi (film), a 2011 Malayalam film
 Urumi language, an extinct Tupian language of Brazil
 Urumi Kanzaki, a character from Great Teacher Onizuka